The Honda Indy V8 is a 3-litre and 3.5-litre, naturally-aspirated V8 racing engine, developed and produced by Honda Performance Development in partnership with Ilmor Engineering for IndyCar Series.Honda Newsroom The V8 was a highly successful IndyCar Series engine from 2003 to 2011 season before being replaced by Honda Indy V6 for the following season. Honda Indy V8 was unveiled at the 2002 Detroit Auto Show and assembled at HPD power assembly plant in Santa Clarita, California, USA and Ilmor Engineering Inc. in Plymouth, Michigan, USA.

1st generation (2003–2004)
Honda debuted IndyCar Series as engine supplier in 2003 season after a CART successful era. Developed by Honda Performance Development (HPD) with technical support from Ilmor and designated as HI3R, engine's capacity was 3.5-liter. HPD and Ilmor provide trackside support and engine rebuilding services to teams. Honda supplied Andretti Green Racing, Team Rahal, Fernández Racing and Access Motorsports teams. Honda's 2003 stats were 3 pole positions, 6 fastest laps and 2 wins. A revised engine named HI4R was used in 2004 until new regulations came into effect at the 2004 Indianapolis 500.

Applications
Dallara IR-03
G-Force GF09

2nd generation (2004–2006)
Honda designed a new engine to address the 2004 IRL rule change which required reduced displacement. Developed once again by Ilmor and designated as HI4R-A, its capacity was 3.0-liter and debuted at the 2004 Indianapolis 500. With subsequent evolutions named HI5R and HI6R, Honda was clearly dominant engine, scoring 33 poles, 35 fastest laps, 41 wins totally in three seasons including 3 Indianapolis 500s. Since Chevrolet and Toyota left IndyCar Series after 2005 season, Honda won exclusive tender IndyCar Series engine supplier for 2006 to 2011 seasons.

Applications
Dallara IR-03
Panoz GF09B
Panoz PZ09C

3rd generation (2007–2011)
This family was designed as a replacement for the HI6R but enlarged to better accommodate variable valve timing and Active Fuel Management while still generating good performance. HI7R-HI11Rs capacity reverted to 3.5-liters respectively since 2007 season. HI7R-HI11R engine was developed and assembled by Honda in Santa Clarita, California, USA (Honda Performance Development's current headquarters) but remained under support from Ilmor Engineering for partial design R&D, trackside support, engine arrangement, tune-up and engine maintenance. HI7R-HI11R engine supplied for all IndyCar Series teams. HI7R-HI11R was a highly successful engine as it was the only one in competition with 86 pole positions, fastest laps, and wins respectively including 2008 Nikon Indy 300 exhibition race and 5 Indianapolis 500s. Due to the IndyCar Series chassis and engine development freeze beginning in 2008, IndyCar Series kept the Honda Indy V8 3rd generation model until 2011 season for cost reasons. The combustion of the Honda Indy V8 was a four-stroke piston Otto cycle.

Year 2011 final specificationsEngine type: Naturally-aspirated, fuel-injected, aluminum-alloy, 90-degree V-8 engineDisplacement: Valve train: Dual overhead camshaft, four valves per cylinder, finger-follower actuated coil spring/valve assemblyCrankshaft: Steel alloy, five main bearingsPistons: Billet aluminum-alloyConnecting rods: Machined steel-alloyEngine management: McLaren Electronics Engine Control Unit (ECU) with engine strategies by Honda Performance Development (previously Motorola in 2003–2010)Ignition system: Digital inductiveInjection system: Single-injector per cylinder, fed by an engine-driven mechanical fuel pump (electronic indirect ported multi-point)Lubrication: Combined pressure and scavenge system featuring an oil pressure stage, multi-stage oil scavenge with an oil/air separator. Most cars utilize either an oil bypass or an oil thermostat for precise engine temperature controlCooling: Single mechanical water pump feeding a single-sided cooling systemTransmission: Xtrac #P295 6-speed sequential manual gearbox (2003–2007), paddle-shift (2008–2011)Fuel: 100% fuel-grade ethanol by SunocoWeight''': 

Applications
Dallara IR-05

Honors
On 10 February 2012, Honda Indy V8 was honored as "North American Race Engine of the Year" by Race Engine Magazine''.

References

External links
Honda Performance Development official website
IndyCar Series official website

Engines by model
Honda engines
IndyCar Series
V8 engines